Kuklin or Kouklin (from кукла meaning a doll) is a Russian masculine surname, its feminine counterpart is Kuklina or Kouklina. It may refer to:

Polina Kouklina (born 1986), Russian fashion model

References

Russian-language surnames